Géza Vajda is a Hungarian orienteering competitor. He received a bronze medal in the relay event at the 1972 World Orienteering Championships in Jičín, together with Zoltán Boros, János Sőtér and András Hegedűs.

References

Year of birth missing (living people)
Living people
Hungarian orienteers
Male orienteers
Foot orienteers
World Orienteering Championships medalists